Harich may refer to the following places:

Harich, Netherlands, a village in Friesland, the Netherlands
Harich, Armenia, a village in Shirak, Armenia